Stenotarsus is a genus of handsome fungus beetles in the family Endomychidae. There are more than 50 described species in Stenotarsus.

Species
These 59 species belong to the genus Stenotarsus:

 Stenotarsus affaber Boheman, 1840
 Stenotarsus aokii Chujo, 1942
 Stenotarsus atripennis Strohecker
 Stenotarsus blatchleyi Walton, 1928
 Stenotarsus brevicollis Perty, 1832
 Stenotarsus chujoi Strohecker, 1957
 Stenotarsus circumdatus Gerstaecker, 1858
 Stenotarsus cortesi Arriaga-Varela, Zaragoza-Caballero, Tomaszewska & Navarrete-Heredia, 2013
 Stenotarsus discipennis Gorham, 1890
 Stenotarsus exiguus Gorham
 Stenotarsus flavago Gorham, 1873
 Stenotarsus flavipes Heller, 1916
 Stenotarsus flavomaculatus Strohecker
 Stenotarsus flavoscapularis Strohecker
 Stenotarsus globosus Guérin-Méneville, 1857
 Stenotarsus guatemalae Arrow
 Stenotarsus hispidus (Herbst, 1799)
 Stenotarsus incisus
 Stenotarsus kafkai
 Stenotarsus kurosai
 Stenotarsus latipes Arrow, 1920
 Stenotarsus lemniscatus Gorham
 Stenotarsus lombardeaui Perroud, 1864
 Stenotarsus marginalis Arrow, 1920
 Stenotarsus mesoamericanus Arriaga-Varela, Zaragoza-Caballero, Tomaszewska & Navarrete-Heredia, 2013
 Stenotarsus mexicanus Arriaga-Varela, Zaragoza-Caballero, Tomaszewska & Navarrete-Heredia, 2013
 Stenotarsus militaris Gerstaecker, 1858
 Stenotarsus molgorae
 Stenotarsus monrovius Strohecker
 Stenotarsus monterrosoi
 Stenotarsus nakanoshimensis
 Stenotarsus nigricans Gorham
 Stenotarsus nigricollis Gorham, 1873
 Stenotarsus nigricornis Gerstäcker, 1857
 Stenotarsus oblongulus Gorham
 Stenotarsus obtusus Gerstäcker, 1858
 Stenotarsus orbicularis Gerstaecker
 Stenotarsus oshimanus
 Stenotarsus ovalis Arrow
 Stenotarsus parallelicornis
 Stenotarsus pilatei Gorham, 1873
 Stenotarsus politus Strohecker
 Stenotarsus pusillus Gerstäcker, 1858
 Stenotarsus raramuri Arriaga-Varela, Zaragoza-Caballero, Tomaszewska & Navarrete-Heredia, 2013
 Stenotarsus rubrocinctus Gerstaecker, 1858
 Stenotarsus rulfoi
 Stenotarsus russatus Gorham, 1874
 Stenotarsus ryukyuensis Chujo & Kiuchi, 1974
 Stenotarsus sallaei Gorham
 Stenotarsus sallei Gorham, 1873
 Stenotarsus shockleyi
 Stenotarsus signatus Boheman, 1840
 Stenotarsus smithi Gorham, 1890
 Stenotarsus solidus Casey
 Stenotarsus spiropenis
 Stenotarsus tarsalis Gorham, 1890
 Stenotarsus thoracicus Gorham, 1890
 Stenotarsus validicornis Gerstaecker, 1858
 Stenotarsus ventricosus Gerstäcker, 1858
 Stenotarsus yoshionis Chujo, 1938

References

Further reading

External links

 

Endomychidae
Articles created by Qbugbot
Coccinelloidea genera